Naseri was the name given to the town of Ahwaz, Khuzestan, Iran as it was refurbished and enlarged in the late 19th century by the eponymous Qajar king, Nasir al-Din Shah. The name lasted into the 1930s, when it was once again changed back to Ahwaz (q.v.).

Ahvaz
Qajar Iran